Microbacterium profundi is a Gram-positive, neutrophilic, aerobic and rod-shaped bacterium from the genus Microbacterium which has been isolated from deep-sea sediments from the Pacific Ocean.

References

Further reading

External links
Type strain of Microbacterium profundi at BacDive -  the Bacterial Diversity Metadatabase	

Bacteria described in 2008
profundi